The Ceno is a  tributary of the river Taro,  flowing entirely within the Province of Parma,  northern Italy. It joins the Taro on its left bank at Fornovo.

Like the Taro, the Ceno has its source on Monte Penna, in the Ligurian Apennine, though it rises on the opposite side of the mountain to the Taro. The Ceno's average final volume is approximately half that of the Taro, but can vary substantially depending from the season. Its discharge occasionally exceeds . The Ceno is near Bardi.

Rivers of Italy
Rivers of the Province of Parma
Rivers of the Apennines